Steven J. Morse (born April 22, 1957) is an American politician in the state of Minnesota. He served in the Minnesota State Senate.

References

Democratic Party Minnesota state senators
1957 births
Living people
People from Winona County, Minnesota
University of Minnesota
University of Wisconsin–La Crosse alumni